Parmotrema aldabrense is a species of lichen in the family Parmeliaceae that is found in Africa. It was first described by Carroll William Dodge in 1959 as a species of Parmelia. Mason Hale transferred it to the genus Parmotrema in 1974. The type collection was made in the Aldabra Islands, where it was found growing on tamarind. It has also been recorded from Madagascar.

See also
List of Parmotrema species

References

aldabrense
Lichen species
Lichens described in 1959
Lichens of Africa
Taxa named by Carroll William Dodge
Lichens of Madagascar